Paper size standards govern the size of sheets of paper used as writing paper, stationery, cards, and for some printed documents.

The ISO 216 standard, which includes the commonly used A4 size, is the international standard for paper size. It is used across the world except in North America and parts of Central and South America, where North American paper sizes such as "Letter" and "Legal" are used. The international standard for envelopes is the C series of ISO 269.

International paper sizes 

The international paper size standard is ISO 216.  It is based on the German DIN 476 standard for paper sizes. ISO paper sizes are all based on a single aspect ratio of the square root of 2, or approximately 1:1.41421. There are different series, as well as several extensions.

The following international paper sizes are included in Cascading Style Sheets (CSS): A3, A4, A5, B4, B5.

A series 

Since A series sizes share the same aspect ratio, they can be scaled to other A-series sizes without being distorted, and two sheets can be reduced to fit on exactly one sheet without any cutoff or margins.

or, rounded to the nearest millimetre, .

A series sizes are related in that the smaller dimension of a given size is the larger dimension of the next smaller size, and folding an A series sheet in half in its larger dimension—that is, folding it in half parallel to its short edge—results in two-halves that are each the size of the next smaller A series size. As such, a folded brochure of a given A-series size can be made by folding sheets of the next larger size in half, e.g. A4 sheets can be folded to make an A5 brochure.

 

where a is the long side and b is the short side. The aspect ratio for the new dimensions of the folded paper is:

 

When a sheet is folded, the length to width ratio does not change.

The formats that became A2, A3, B3, B4 and B5 were developed in France, having been proposed by the mathematician Lazare Carnot, and published for judicial purposes in 1798 during the French Revolution. Early in the 20th century, Dr Walter Porstmann turned Lichtenberg's idea into a proper system of different paper sizes. Porstmann's system was introduced as a DIN standard (DIN 476) in Germany in 1922, replacing a vast variety of other paper formats. Even today, the paper sizes are called "DIN A4" in everyday use in Germany and Austria.

The DIN 476 standard spread quickly to other countries. Before the outbreak of World War II, it had been adopted by the following countries:

 Belgium (1924)
 Netherlands (1925)
 Norway (1926)

 Finland (1927)
 Sweden (1930)
 Switzerland (1929)

 Hungary (1938)
 Italy (1939)
 Soviet Union (1934)

During World War II, the standard was adopted by Uruguay (1942), Argentina (1943) and Brazil (1943), and afterwards spread to other countries:

 Australia (1974)
 Austria (1948)
 Bangladesh (1972)
 Barbados (1973)
 Chile (1968)
 Colombia (1975)
 Czechoslovakia (now Czechia and Slovakia) (1953)
 Denmark (1953)
 Ecuador (1974)
 France (1967)
 Greece (1970)
 Iceland (1964)
 India (1957)
 Iran (1948)
 Ireland (1959)
 Israel (1954)
 Japan (1951)
 Kuwait (1975)
 Mexico (1965)
 New Zealand (1963)
 Peru (1967)
 Poland (1957)
 Portugal (1954)
 Rhodesia (now Zimbabwe) (1970)
 Romania (1949)
 Singapore (1970)
 South Africa (1966)
 Spain (1947)
 Thailand (1973)
 Turkey (1967)
 United Kingdom (1971)
 Venezuela (1962)
 Yugoslavia (now Croatia, Serbia, Slovenia, Bosnia and Herzegovina, Montenegro, and North Macedonia) (1956)

By 1975, so many countries were using the German system that it was established as an ISO standard, as well as the official United Nations document format. By 1977, A4 was the standard letter format in 88 of 148 countries. Today the standard has been adopted by all countries in the world except the United States and Canada. In Mexico, Costa Rica, Colombia, Venezuela, Chile, and the Philippines, the US letter format is still in common use, despite their official adoption of the ISO standard.

The weight of an A-series sheet of a given paper weight can be calculated by knowing the ratio of its size to the A0 sheet.

B series 

The B series paper sizes are less common than the A series. They have the same aspect ratio of A series:

However, they have a different area. The area of B series sheets is in fact the geometric mean of successive A series sheets. B1 is between A0 and A1 in size, with an area of 0.707 m ( m). That side is the short side for B0, B2, B4, etc., and the long side for B1, B3, B5, etc.

While less common in-office use, the B series is used for a variety of special applications.

 B4, B5, and B6 are used for envelopes that fit C-series envelopes.
 B5 is a relatively common choice for books.
 B7 is equal to the passport size ID-3 from ISO/IEC 7810.
 Many posters use B-series paper or a close approximation, such as 50 cm × 70 cm ~ B2.

The B-series is widely used in the printing industry to describe both paper sizes and printing press sizes, including digital presses. B3 paper is used to print two US letter or A4 pages side by side using imposition; four pages would be printed on B2, eight on B1, etc.

C series 

The C series is defined in ISO 269, which was withdrawn in 2009 without a replacement, but is still specified in several national standards. It is primarily used for envelopes. The area of C series sheets is the geometric mean of the areas of the A and B series sheets of the same number; for instance, the area of a C4 sheet is the geometric mean of the areas of an A4 sheet and a B4 sheet. This means that C4 is slightly larger than A4, and slightly smaller than B4. The practical usage of this is that a letter written on A4 paper fits inside a C4 envelope, and both A4 paper and C4 envelope fits inside a B4 envelope.

Some envelope formats with mixed sides from adjacent sizes (and thus an approximate aspect ratio of 2:1) are also defined in national adaptations of the ISO standard, e.g. DIN C6/C5 (also known as C65) is 114 mm × 229 mm where the common side to C5 and C6 is 162 mm. This format allows an envelope holding an A-sized paper folded in three, e.g. for the C65, an A4.

Overview of ISO paper sizes 

The  variables are the distinct first terms in the three geometric progressions of the same common-ratio equal to the square root of two. Each of the three geometric progressions (corresponding to the three series A, B, C) is formed by all possible paper dimensions (length and width) of the series arranged in decreasing order. This interesting arrangement of dimensions is also very useful—not only it forms a geometric progression with easy to remember formulae, it also has that each consecutive pair of values (like a sliding window of size 2) will automatically correspond to the dimensions of a standard paper format in the series.

The tolerances specified in the standard are

 ±1.5 mm (0.06 in) for dimensions up to 150 mm (5.9 in),
 ±2 mm (0.08 in) for lengths in the range 150 to 600 mm (5.9 to 23.6 in) and
 ±3 mm (0.12 in) for any dimension above 600 mm (23.6 in).

German original 

The German standard DIN 476 was published on 18 August 1922 and is the original specification of the A, B and C sizes. In 1991, it was split into DIN 476-1 for the A and B formats and 476-2 for the C series. The former has been withdrawn in 2002 in favor of adopting the international standard as DIN EN ISO 216, but part 2 has been retained and was last updated in 2008.

The first and the second editions of DIN 476 from 1922 and 1925 also included a D series.

The smallest formats specified originally were A13 and B13, which were reduced to x10 in the 1930 edition, as well as C8 and D8; C9 and C10 have been added in the 1976 revision for compatibility with photography sizes: C8 closely matches 6×9 photos, C9 and C10 closely match 7×7 and 5×5 slides, respectively.

DIN 476 provides for formats larger than A0, denoted by a prefix factor. In particular, it lists the formats 2A0 and 4A0, which are twice and four times the size of A0 respectively.
However, ISO 216:2007 notes 2A0 and 4A0 in the table of Main series of trimmed sizes (ISO A series) as well: "The rarely used sizes [2A0 and 4A0] which follow also belong to this series."

DIN 476 also used to specify slightly tighter tolerances than ISO 216:

 ±1 mm (0.04 in) for dimensions up to 150 mm (5.9 in),
 ±1.5 mm (0.06 in) for lengths in the range 150 mm to 600 mm (5.9 to 23.6 in) and
 ±2 mm (0.08 in) for any dimension above 600 mm (23.6 in).

There used to be a standard, DIN 198, that was just a table of recommended A series formats for a number of business applications. The 1976 edition of this standard introduced a size  A4  and suggested it for some forms and slips.

Swedish extensions 

The Swedish standard SIS 01 47 11 generalized the ISO system of A, B, and C formats by adding D, E, F, and G formats to it. Its D format sits between a B format and the next larger A format (just like C sits between A and the next larger B). The remaining formats fit in between all these formats, such that the sequence of formats A4, E4, C4, F4, B4, G4, D4, *H4, A3 is a geometric progression, in which the dimensions grow by a factor  from one size to the next. However, this SIS standard does not define any size between a D format and the next larger A format (called *H in the previous example).

Of these additional formats, G5 (169 × 239 mm) and E5 (155 × 220 mm) are popular in Sweden and the Netherlands for printing dissertations, but the other formats have not turned out to be particularly useful in practice. They have not been adopted internationally and the Swedish standard has been withdrawn.

The Swedish and German D series basically contain the same sizes but are offset by one, i.e. DIN D4 equals SIS D5 and so on.

Japanese variation 

The Japanese standard JIS P 0138 defines two main series of paper sizes. The JIS A-series is identical to the ISO A-series, but with slightly different tolerances. The area of B-series paper is 1.5 times that of the corresponding A-paper (instead of the factor  = 1.414... for the ISO B-series), so the length ratio is approximately 1.22 times the length of the corresponding A-series paper. The aspect ratio of the paper is the same as for the A-series paper. Both A- and B-series paper are widely available in Japan, Taiwan and China, and most photocopiers are loaded with at least A4 and either one of A3, B4, and B5 paper.

Cascading Style Sheets (CSS) only supports the most popular sizes, JIS-B4 and JIS-B5.

A popular size for books, dubbed AB, combines the shorter edges of A4 and B4. Another two with an aspect ratio approximating 16:9 are 20% narrower variants of A6 and B6, respectively, the latter resulting from cutting JIS B1 into  sheets (thus "B40").

There are also a number of traditional paper sizes, which are now used mostly by printers. The most common of these old series is the Shiroku-ban and the Kiku paper sizes.

Chinese extensions 

The Chinese standard GB/T 148–1997, which replaced GB 148–1989, documents the standard ISO series, A and B, but adds a custom D series. This Chinese format originates from the Republic of China (1912–1949). The D series is not identical to the German or Swedish D series. The short side of the size is always 4 mm longer than the long side of the next smaller size. The long side of the size is always exactly – i.e. without further rounding – twice as long as the short side of the next smaller size.

Indian variants 
The Bureau of Indian Standards recommends the "ISO-A series" size of drawing sheet for engineering drawing works. The Bureau of Indian Standards specifies all the recommendations for engineering drawing sheets in its bulletin IS 10711: 2001.

The Bureau extended the ISO-A series with a Special Elongated Sizes (Second Choice). These sizes are achieved by increasing the shorter dimensions of a sheet of the ISO A series to lengths that are multiples of the shorter dimensions of the chosen basic sheet. These sizes are used when a sheet of greater length is needed. 

There is also a Exceptional Elongated Sizes (Third Choice). These sizes are obtained by increasing the shorter dimensions of a sheet of the ISO-A series to lengths that are multiples of the shorter dimensions of the chosen basic sheet. These sizes are used when a very large or extra elongated sheet is needed.

Soviet variants 

The first standard of paper size in the Soviet Union was OST 303 in 1926. Six years later, it was replaced by OST 5115 which generally followed DIN 476 principles, but used Cyrillic lowercase letters instead of Latin uppercase, had the second row shifted so that б0 (B0) roughly corresponded to B1 and, more importantly, had slightly different sizes:

The general adaptation of ISO 216 in the Soviet Union, which replaced OST 5115, was GOST 9327. In its 1960 version, it lists formats down to A13, B12 and C8 and also specifies ,  and  prefixes for halving the shorter side (repeatedly) for stripe formats, e.g. A4 = 105 mm × 297 mm.

A standard for technical drawings from 1960, GOST 3450, introduces alternative numeric format designations to deal with very high or very wide sheets.
These 2-digit codes are based upon A4 = "11": The first digit is the factor the longer side (297 mm) is multiplied by and the second digit is the one for the shorter side (210 mm), so "24" is 2×297 mm × 4×210 mm = 594 mm × 840 mm.

GOST 3450 from 1960 was replaced by ESKD GOST 2301 in 1968, but the numeric designations remained in popular use much longer.
The new designations were not purely numeric but consisted of the ISO label followed by an 'x', or possibly the multiplication sign '×', and the factor, e.g. DIN 2A0 = GOST A0×2, but DIN 4A0 ≠ GOST A0×4, also listed are: A0×3, A1×3, A1×4, A2×3–A2×5, A3×3–A3×7, A4×3–A4×9. The formats ...×1 and ...×2 usually would be aliases for existing formats.

Elongated sizes 

ISO 5457, last updated in 1999, introduces elongated sizes that are formed by a combination of the dimensions of the short side of an A-size (e.g. A2) with the dimensions of the long side of another larger A-size (e.g. A0). The result is a new size, for example with the abbreviation A2.0 we would have a  mm size.

These drawing paper sizes have been adopted by ANSI/ASME Y14.1M for use in the United States, alongside A0 through A4 and aloongside inch-based sizes.

International envelope and insert sizes 

DIN 5008 (previously DIN 676) prescribes, among many other things, two variants, A and B, for the location of the address field on the first page of a business letter and how to fold the A4 sheet accordingly, so the only part visible of the main content is the subject line.

International raw sizes 

ISO 5457 specifies drawing paper sizes with a trimmed size equal to the A series sizes from A4 upward. The untrimmed sizes are 3 to 4 cm larger and rounded to the nearest centimeter. A0 through A3 are used in landscape orientation, while A4 is used in portrait orientation. Designations for preprinted drawing paper include the base sizes and a suffix, either T for trimmed or U for untrimmed sheets.

The withdrawn standard ISO 2784 did specify sizes of continuous, fan-fold forms based upon whole inches as was common for paper in continuous lengths in automatic data processing (ADP) equipment. Specifically, 12 inches (304.8 mm) were considered an untrimmed variant of the A4 height of 297 mm.

Transitional paper sizes

PA4 or L4 

A transitional size called PA4, sometimes dubbed L4, was proposed for inclusion into the ISO 216 standard in 1975. It has the height of Canadian P4 paper (215 mm × 280 mm, about  in × 11 in) and the width of international A4 paper, i.e. it uses the smaller value among the two for each side. The table shows how this format can be generalized into an entire format series.

The PA formats did not end up in ISO 216, because the committee decided that the set of standardized paper formats should be kept to the minimum necessary. However, PA4 remains of practical use today. In landscape orientation, it has the same 4:3 aspect ratio as the displays of traditional TV sets, some computer displays (e.g. the iPad) and data projectors. PA4, with appropriate margins is, therefore, a good choice as the format of presentation slides.

As a compromise between the two most popular paper sizes globally, PA4 is used today by many international magazines, because it can be printed easily on equipment designed for either A4 or US Letter. That means it is not as much a paper size as a page format. Apple, for instance, requires this format for digital music album booklets.

The size 210 mm × 280 mm was documented in the Canadian standard CAN2-200.2-M79 "Common Image Area for Paper Sizes P4 and A4".

F4 

A non-standard F4 paper size is common in Southeast Asia. It is a transitional size with the shorter side from ISO A4 (210 mm,  inch) and the longer side from British Foolscap (13-inch, 330 mm) and is sometimes known as (metric) foolscap or folio as well. It is exactly , i.e. 33 mm, longer than A4 or, conversely, A4 is exactly 90% the height of F4.

In Indonesia and the Philippines, "F4" paper is slightly broader: 215 × 330 mm, i.e. basically Foolscap 8.5 × 13 in. In Indonesia it is sometimes called folio, while in Philippines it is sometimes also called long bond.

A sheet of F4 can be cut from a sheet of SRA4 with very little wastage. The size is also smaller than its Swedish equivalent SIS F4 at 239 mm × 338 mm.

Weltformat 

The Weltformat (world format) was developed by German chemist Wilhelm Ostwald in 1911 as part of Die Brücke, around the same time DIN 476 was first discussed. It shares the same design primitives, especially the aspect ratio, but is based upon 1 cm as the short edge of the smallest size. Sizes were designated by roman numerals. 
The result, for the fourth through fourteenth size, is close to the DIN/ISO C series. 

The sizes have been used for some print products in the early 20th century in central Europe but got replaced by DIN sizes almost entirely. However, it was successfully adopted from 1913 onwards for posters and placards in Switzerland. Even today the default size for posters in Swiss advertisements is 905 mm × 1280 mm, i.e. size XIV, but now simply known as Weltformat.

A0a 

Although the movement is towards the international standard metric paper sizes, on the way there from the traditional ones there has been at least one new size just a little larger than that used internationally.

This is a little larger than ISO A0, 841 mm × 1189 mm.

Pliego 

The most common paper sizes used for commercial and industrial printing in Colombia are based upon a size referred to as pliego that is ISO B1 (707 mm × 1000 mm) cut to full decimetres. Smaller sizes are derived by halving as usual and just get a vulgar fraction prefix:  pliego and  pliego.

K 

In East Asia, i.e. Japan, Taiwan, and China in particular, there is a number of similar paper sizes in common use for book-making and other purposes. 

The sizes of such folios depend on the base sheet. Pre-metric standards include:

 The imperial 菊判 (kiku-ban), named after the Chrysanthemum watermark on imperial paper, measuring 636mm × 939mm.
 The four-by-six 四六判 shi-roku-ban (4×6 or 4/6), where the final size at 32K was measured 4 by 6 sun in Japan, c.  mm, or slightly more,  mm i.e.  sun.
 In Taiwan, the traditional base size 1K inherited from Japan is sometimes quoted as measuring  inches exactly, which is off by c. 1 millimeter from the commonly quoted metric base size of  mm, which is directly derived from  sun or  shaku.
 The three-by-five 三五判 (3×5 or 3/5), where the final size at 32K is slightly less than 3 by 5 sun, often given as  mm which would be c.  sun.

The 4/6 standard has given rise to newer metric book-size standards, including:

 The modern Japanese size for books, simply labeled B and is specified as  millimeters. It is not directly related to the similar JIS B series, where B1 is slightly smaller.
 The Chinese SAC D series.

North American paper sizes

Inch-based loose sizes 

The United States, Canada, and the Philippines primarily use a different system of paper sizes from the rest of the world. The current standard sizes are unique to those countries, although due to the size of the North American market and proliferation of both software and printing hardware from the region, other parts of the world have become increasingly familiar with these sizes (though not necessarily the paper itself). Some traditional North American inch-based sizes differ from the Imperial British sizes described below.

Common American loose sizes 

Letter, Legal and Ledger/Tabloid are by far the most commonly used of these for everyday activities, and the only ones included in Cascading Style Sheets (CSS).

The origins of the exact dimensions of Letter size paper are lost in tradition and not well documented. The American Forest and Paper Association argues that the dimension originates from the days of manual papermaking and that the 11-inch length of the page is about a quarter of "the average maximum stretch of an experienced vatman's arms." However, this does not explain the width or aspect ratio.

Outside of North America, Letter size may also be known as "American Quarto". If one accepts some trimming, the size is indeed one quarter of the old Imperial paper size known as Demy, . 

Usage and adoption 

US paper sizes are currently standard in the United States and are the most commonly used formats at least in the Philippines, most of Mesoamerica and Chile. The latter use US Letter, but their Legal size is 13 inches tall (recognized as Foolscap by printer manufacturers, i.e. one inch shorter than its US equivalent.

Mexico and Colombia, for instance, have adopted the ISO standard, but the US Letter format is still the system in use throughout the country. It is rare to encounter ISO standard papers in day-to-day uses, with Carta (Letter), Oficio (Government-Legal), and Doble carta (Ledger/Tabloid) being nearly universal. 

In Canada, select US paper sizes are a de facto standard.

Variant American loose sizes 

There is an additional paper size, to which the name Government-Letter was given by the IEEE Printer Working Group (PWG). It was prescribed by Herbert Hoover when he was Secretary of Commerce to be used for US government forms, apparently to enable discounts from the purchase of paper for schools, but more likely due to the standard use of trimming books (after binding) and paper from the standard letter size paper to produce consistency and allow "bleed" printing. In later years, as photocopy machines proliferated, citizens wanted to make photocopies of the forms, but the machines did not generally have this size of paper in their bins. Ronald Reagan therefore had the US government switch to regular Letter size, which is half an inch both longer and wider. The former government size is still commonly used in spiral-bound notebooks, for children's writing and the like, a result of trimming from the current Letter dimensions.

By extension of the American standards, the halved Letter size, meets the needs of many applications. It is variably known as Statement, Stationery, Memo, Half Letter, Half A (from ANSI sizes) or simply Half Size, and as Invoice by printer manufacturers. Like the similar-sized ISO A5, it is used for everything from personal letter writing to official aeronautical maps. Organizers, notepads, and diaries also often use this size of paper; thus 3-ring binders are also available in this size. Booklets of this size are created using word processing tools with landscape printing in two columns on letter paper which are then cut or folded into the final size.

A foot-long sheet with the common width of Letter and (Government) Legal, i.e. , would have an aspect ratio very close to the square root of two as used by international paper sizes and would actually almost exactly match ISO RA4 (215 mm × 305 mm). This size is sometimes known as European Fanfold.

Standardized American paper sizes 

In 1996, the American National Standards Institute adopted ANSI/ASME Y14.1 which defined a regular series of paper sizes based upon the de facto standard  Letter size which it assigned "ANSI A", intended for technical drawings, hence sometimes labeled "Engineering". This series is somewhat similar to the ISO standard in that cutting a sheet in half would produce two sheets of the next smaller size and therefore also includes Ledger/Tabloid as "ANSI B". Unlike the ISO standard, however, the arbitrary base sides forces this series to have two alternating aspect ratios. For example, ANSI A is less elongated than A4, while ANSI B is more elongated than A3.

The Canadian standard CAN2 9.60-M76 and its successor CAN/CGSB 9.60-94 "Paper Sizes for Correspondence" specified paper sizes P1 through P6, which are the U.S. paper sizes rounded to the nearest 5 mm. All custom Canadian paper size standards were withdrawn in 2012.

With care, documents can be prepared so that the text and images fit on either ANSI or their equivalent ISO sheets at a 1:1 reproduction scale.

Other, informal, larger sizes continuing the alphabetic series illustrated above exist, but they are not part of the series per se, because they do not exhibit the same aspect ratios. Engineering H through N sizes are also roll formats.

Such huge sheets were at one time used for full-scale layouts of aircraft parts, automotive parts, wiring harnesses, and the like, but are slowly being phased out, due to widespread use of computer-aided design (CAD) and computer-aided manufacturing (CAM). Some visual arts fields also continue to use these paper formats for large-scale printouts, such as for displaying digitally painted character renderings at life-size as references for makeup artists and costume designers or to provide an immersive landscape reference.

Architectural sizes 

In addition to the system as listed above, there is a corresponding series of paper sizes used for architectural purposes defined in the same standard, ANSI/ASME Y14.1, which is usually abbreviated "Arch". This series also shares the property that bisecting each size produces two of the size below, with alternating aspect ratios. It may be preferred by North American architects because the aspect ratios (4:3 and 3:2) are ratios of small integers, unlike their ANSI (or ISO) counterparts. Furthermore, the aspect ratio 4:3 matches the traditional aspect ratio for computer displays.

The size Arch E1 has a different aspect ratio because it derives from adding 6 inches to each side of Arch D or subtracting the same amount from Arch E. Printer manufacturer recognize it as wide-format. An intermediate size between Arch C and D with a long side of  does not exist.

Demitab 

"Demitab", "broadsheet" or "tabloid" format newspapers are not necessarily printed on paper measuring exactly their nominal size.

Notebook sizes 

The sizes listed above are for paper sold loose in reams. There are many sizes of tablets of paper, that is, sheets of paper bound at one edge, usually by a strip of plastic or hardened PVA adhesive. Often there is a pad of cardboard (also known as paperboard or greyboard) at the bottom of the stack. Such a tablet serves as a portable writing surface, and the sheets often have lines printed on them, usually in non-repro blue, to make writing in a line easier. An older means of binding is to have the sheets stapled to the cardboard along the top of the tablet; there is a line of perforated holes across every page just below the top edge from which any page may be torn off. Lastly, a pad of sheets each weakly stuck with adhesive to the sheet below, trademarked as "Post-It" or "Stick-Em" and available in various sizes, serve as a sort of tablet.

Envelope sizes 

This implies that all postcards have an aspect ratio in the range from  = 1.18 to  = 1.71, but the machinable aspect ratio is further restricted to a minimum of 1.30.
The only ISO 216 size in the US postcard range is A6.
The theoretical maximum aspect ratio for enveloped letters is  = 3.29, but is explicitly limited to 2.50.

Personal organizer sizes

Index card sizes

Photography sizes

Grain 

Most industry standards express the direction of the grain last when giving dimensions (that is, 17 × 11 inches is short grain paper and 11 × 17 inches is long grain paper), although alternatively the grain alignment can be explicitly indicated with an underline (11 × 17 is a short grain) or the letter "M" for "machine" (11M × 17 is a short grain). Grain is important because the paper will crack if folded across the grain: for example, if a sheet 17 × 11 inches is to be folded to divide the sheet into two 8.5 × 11 halves, then the grain will be along the 11-inch side. Paper intended to be fed into a machine that will bend the paper around rollers, such as a printing press, photocopier or typewriter, should be fed grain edge first so that the axis of the rollers is along the grain.

Traditional inch-based paper sizes 

Traditionally, a number of different sizes were defined for large sheets of paper, and paper sizes were defined by the sheet name and the number of times it had been folded. Thus a full sheet of "royal" paper was 25 × 20 inches, and "royal octavo" was this size folded three times, so as to make eight sheets, and was thus 10 ×  inches. Royal sizes were used for posters and billboards.

Imperial sizes were used in the United Kingdom and its territories and some survived in US book printing.

Traditional British paper sizes 

Traditional British paper sizes are referred to by the number of sheets that can be cut from a sheet of uncut paper. The standard Imperial uncut paper sizes are "foolscap", "post", and "copy". Each uncut sheet can then be halved into folios, quartered into quartos, or eigthed into octavos.

Foolscap folio and quarto are similar in size to the modern A4 and A5 papers, with the latter in particular often being used for letter-writing and referred to a Kings paper.

Traditional French paper sizes 

Before the adoption of the ISO standard system in 1967, France had its own paper size system. Raisin format is still in use today for artistic paper. All are standardized by the AFNOR. Their names come from the watermarks that the papers were branded with when they were handcrafted, which is still the case for certain art papers. They also generally exist in double versions where the smallest measure is multiplied by two, or in quadruple versions where both measures have been doubled.

Business card sizes 

The international business card has the size of the smallest rectangle containing a credit card rounded to full millimeters, but in Western Europe, it is rounded to half centimeters (rounded up in Northern Europe), in Eastern Europe to full centimeters, in North America to half inches. However, credit card size, as defined in ISO/IEC 7810, also specifies rounded corners and thickness.

Newspaper sizes 

Newspapers have a separate set of sizes.

 Compact: AR 1.54
 Berliner: aspect ratio is 1.5
 Rhenish: AR 1.4–1.5
 Tabloid 1.34
 Broadsheet: aspect ratio 1.25

In a recent trend many newspapers have been undergoing what is known as "web cut down", in which the publication is redesigned to print using a narrower (and less expensive) roll of paper. In extreme examples, some broadsheet papers are nearly as narrow as traditional tabloids.

See also 

 Book size
 Continuous stationery
 Hole punch – filing holes
 New Zealand standard for school stationery
 PC LOAD LETTER
 Paper density
 Units of paper quantity – ream, quire etc.

References

Further reading 

 International standard ISO 216, Writing paper and certain classes of printed matter—Trimmed sizes—A and B series. International Organization for Standardization, Geneva, 1975.
 International standard ISO 217: Paper—Untrimmed sizes—Designation and tolerances for primary and supplementary ranges, and an indication of machine direction. International Organization for Standardization, Geneva, 1995.
 
  (54 pages)

External links 

  Notably: About margin settings for using just the space common to both A4 and US Letter.
  
 

Book design
Mechanical standards
Paper
Stationery
Technical drawing